Sunila Apte is a female badminton player from India.

Career
Apte has won three doubles titles at Indian National Badminton Championship, with her sister Sarojini Gogte.

References

Indian female badminton players
Indian national badminton champions
Living people
Year of birth missing (living people)
Sportswomen from Maharashtra
Marathi people
Racket sportspeople from Maharashtra